Kaulong, or Pasismanua, is an Austronesian language spoken by about 4000 swidden farmers of the southwest hinterlands of Kandrian District, West New Britain Province, Papua New Guinea on the island of New Britain.

References

Pasismanua languages
Languages of West New Britain Province